Bullfrog Productions was a British video game developer located in Guildford, England. It was founded in 1987 by Peter Molyneux and Les Edgar as a successor to their software company Taurus Impact Systems, with Molyneux as the studio's chief game designer. The company's first release was a 1988 Amiga port of the 1987 Commodore 64 game Druid II: Enlightenment, and its first original game Fusion was released a few months later. Bullfrog's second game, Populous (1989), garnered widespread attention and awards, and sold over four million copies, leading the company to grow to around twenty employees. It was followed by a sequel, Populous II: Trials of the Olympian Gods (1991), as well as eight other games by 1995 in several genres including Syndicate (1993) and Theme Park (1994), the first games in the Syndicate and Theme series. By this point, Bullfrog was widely considered to be one of the most innovative and imaginative video game companies in the world.

Electronic Arts, Bullfrog's primary publisher, bought the studio in 1995 and made Molyneux and Edgar vice-presidents; the company quickly grew from 60 to around 150 employees. Bullfrog released six more games over the next three years, including Dungeon Keeper (1997), the first game in the eponymous series; Molyneux, disliking his new role at Electronic Arts, decided to leave the company in 1996, changing roles to finish the development of Dungeon Keeper and leaving entirely at its conclusion in 1997 along with several other employees to found Lionhead Studios. Bullfrog released a further five games between his departure and 2001 in the Populous, Dungeon Keeper, and Theme series, as well as a port of Quake III Arena (1999), after which it was merged into EA UK and effectively closed as a development studio. During its lifetime Bullfrog Productions released twenty-two games and two ports, primarily for various personal computer systems and often with later PlayStation versions, and worked on at least nine other titles which were cancelled in various stages of development.

Games

Developed

Ports

Cancelled

References

External links
 

Bullfrog Productions